Phiocricetomys is an extinct genus of rodent from Africa.  It is the only genus in the subfamily Phiocricetomyinae.

References

 Lavocat, R. 1973. Les rongeurs du Miocčne d’Afrique Orientale. Memoires et travaux Ecole Pratique des Hautes Etudes, Institut Montpellier, 1:1-284.
 Simons, E.L. and Wood, A.E. 1968. Early Cenozoic mammalian faunas, Fayum Province, Egypt. Part II, the African Oligocene Rodentia. Peabody Museum Bulletin, 28:23-105.

Myophiomyidae
Oligocene rodents
Oligocene mammals of Africa
Prehistoric rodent genera